Three Chords & the Truth is the 41st studio album by Northern Irish singer-songwriter Van Morrison, released on 25 October 2019 by Exile Productions and Caroline Records. His sixth record in four years, it reached the Top 20 in seven countries. Morrison's first album to feature all-new original songs since 2012’s Born to Sing: No Plan B, it includes "If We Wait for Mountains", a co-write with Don Black, and "Fame Will Eat the Soul", a duet with Bill Medley of the Righteous Brothers.

Critical reception

 It was chosen as a 'Favorite Blues Album' by AllMusic. Pitchfork concluded that it demonstrates that "Van Morrison remains one of rock’s most enduring studies in contrast, never changing and forever restless." "Songwriter Harlan Howard coined the phrase “Three chords and the truth” to describe the necessary ingredients for country and western music", it notes, but finds that "this isn’t a country record. Van’s talking about his desire to take simple rhymes and traditional song structures and imbue them with Caledonia soul heaviness." American Songwriter writes that "the vibrant, often vivacious Three Chords and the Truth" finds the 74-year-old "dashing along in an extraordinary creative and fertile clip".

Track listing

Personnel
 Van Morrison - acoustic rhythm guitar, electric guitar, electric piano, saxophone, vocals
 Dave Keary - electric guitar, bazouki
 Jay Berliner - acoustic guitar
 David Hayes, Pete Hurley, Jeremy Brown - bass
 John Allair, Richard Dunn - Hammond organ
 Paul Moran - organ
 Teena Lyle - piano, percussion, vibes
 Stuart McIlroy - piano
 Bobby Ruggiero, Colin Griffin - drums
 Bill Medley - vocals on "Fame Will Eat the Soul"

Charts

References

2019 albums
Van Morrison albums
Albums produced by Van Morrison